This page lists all described species of the harvestmen suborder Dyspnoi. Unless otherwise noted, information is taken from Schönhofer's 2013 taxonomic catalogue. The inclusion of Acropsopilionidae within Dyspnoi is based on Groh & Giribet, 2014.

Acropsopilionoidea

Acropsopilionidae 

 Acropsopilio Silvestri, 1904
 Acropsopilio australicus Cantrell, 1980
 Acropsopilio boopis (Crosby, 1904)
 Acropsopilio chilensis Silvestri, 1904
 Acropsopilio chomulae (Goodnight and Goodnight, 1948)
 Acropsopilio neozealandiae (Forster, 1948)
 Acropsopilio venezuelensis González-Sponga, 1992
 Austropsopilio Forster, 1955
 Austropsopilio altus Cantrell, 1980
 Austropsopilio cygneus Hickman, 1957
 Austropsopilio fuscus (Hickman, 1957)
 Austropsopilio inermis Cantrell, 1980
 Austropsopilio megalops (Hickman, 1957)
 Austropsopilio novaehollandiae Forster, 1955
 Austropsopilio sudamericanus Shultz and Cekalovic, 2003
 Cadella Hirst, 1925
 Cadella africana (Lawrence, 1931)
 Cadella capensis Hirst, 1925
 Cadella croeseri Staręga, 1988
 Cadella haddadi Lotz, 2011
 Cadella jocquei Staręga, 2008
 Cadella spatulipis Lawrence, 1934

Ischyropsalidoidea

Ischyropsalididae

Ceratolasmatinae 

 Acuclavella Shear, 1986
Acuclavella cosmetoides Shear, 1986
 Acuclavella leonardi Richart & Hedin, 2013
 Acuclavella makah Richart & Hedin, 2013
 Acuclavella merickeli Shear, 1986
 Acuclavella quattuor Shear, 1986
 Acuclavella shear Richart & Hedin, 2013
 Acuclavella shoshone Shear, 1986
 Ceratolasma Goodnight & Goodnight, 1942
 Ceratolasma tricantha Goodnight & Goodnight, 1942

Ischyropsalidinae 

 Ischyropsalis C.L.Koch, 1839
Ischyropsalis adamii Canestrini, 1873
 Ischyropsalis alpinula Martens, 1978
 Ischyropsalis cantabrica Luque & Labrada, 2012
 Ischyropsalis carli Lessert, 1905
 Ischyropsalis dentipalpis Canestrini, 1872
 Ischyropsalis dispar Simon, 1872
 Ischyropsalis gigantea Drescoe, 1968
 Ischyropsalis hadzii Roewer, 1950
 Ischyropsalis hellwigii (Panzer, 1794)
 Ischyropsalis hellwigii hellwigii (Panzer, 1794)
 Ischyropsalis hellwigii lucantei Simon, 1879
 Ischyropsalis hispanica Roewer, 1953
 Ischyropsalis kollari C.L. Koch, 1839
 Ischyropsalis lithoclasica Schönhofer & Martens, 2010
 Ischyropsalis luteipes Simon, 1872
 Ischyropsalis magdalenae Simon, 1881
 Ischyropsalis manicata C.L. Koch, 1869
 Ischyropsalis muellneri Harmann, 1898
 Ischyropsalis nodifera Simon, 1879
 Ischyropsalis petiginosa Simon, 1913
 Ischyropsalis pyrenaea Simon, 1872
 Ischyropsalis ravasinii Hadži, 1942
 Ischyropsalis robusta Simon, 1872
 Ischyropsalis strandi Kratochvíl, 1936

Sabaconidae 

 Sabacon Simon, 1879
Sabacon aigoual Martens, 2015
 Sabacon akiyoshiense Suzuki, 1963
 Sabacon altomontanum Martens, 1983
 Sabacon astoriensis Shear, 1975
 Sabacon beatae Martens, 2015
 Sabacon beishanensis Martens, 2015
 Sabacon briggsi Shear, 1975
 Sabacon bryantii (Banks, 1898)
 Sabacon cavicolens (Packard, 1884)
 Sabacon chomolongmae Martens, 1972
 Sabacon crassipalpe (L. Koch, 1879)
 Sabacon dentipalpe Suzuki, 1949
 Sabacon dhaulagiri Martens, 1972
 Sabacon distinctus Suzuki, 1974
 Sabacon franzi Roewer, 1953
 Sabacon gonggashan Tsurusaki & Song, 1993
 Sabacon hinkukhola Martens, 2015
 Sabacon imamurai Suzuki, 1964
 Sabacon iriei Suzuki, 1974
 Sabacon ishizuchi Suzuki, 1974
 Sabacon jaegeri Martens, 2015
 Sabacon jiriensis Martens, 1972
 Sabacon kangding Martens, 2015
 Sabacon maipokhari Martens, 2015
 Sabacon makinoi Suzuki, 1949
 Sabacon makinoi makinoi Suzuki, 1949
 Sabacon makinoi sugimotoi Suzuki & Tsurusaki, 1983
Sabacon martensi Tsurusaki & Song, 1993
 Sabacon minutissimus Martens, 2015
 Sabacon minshanensis Martens, 2015
 Sabacon mitchelli Crosby & Bishop, 1924
 Sabacon monacanthus Zhao, Martens, & Zhang, 2018
 Sabacon multiserratus Martens, 2015
 Sabacon nishikawai Martens, 2015
 Sabacon occidentalis (Banks, 1894)
 Sabacon okadai Suzuki, 1941
 Sabacon palpogranulatum Martens, 1972
 Sabacon paradoxus Simon, 1879
 Sabacon pasonianus Glez-Luque, 1991
 Sabacon pauperoserratus Martens, 2015
 Sabacon petarberoni Martens, 2015
 Sabacon picosantrum Martens, 1983
 Sabacon pygmaeum Miyosi, 1942
 Sabacon relictoides Martens, 2015
 Sabacon relictum Marten, 1972
 Sabacon rossopacificus Martens, 2015
 Sabacon rupinala Martens, 2015
 Sabacon satoikioi Miyosi, 1942
 Sabacon sergeidedicatus Martens, 1989
 Sabacon shawalleri Martens, 2015
 Sabacon sheari Cokendolpher, 1984
 Sabacon simbuakhola Martens, 2015
 Sabacon simoni Dresco, 1952
 Sabacon sineglandula Martens, 2015
 Sabacon siskiyou Shear, 1975
 Sabacon suzukii Zhao, Martens, & Zhang, 2018
 Sabacon thakkolanus Martens, 2015
 Sabacon unicornis Martens, 1972
 Sabacon viscayanus Simon, 1881
 Sabacon viscayanus ramblaianum Martens, 1983
 Sabacon viscayanus viscayanus Simon, 1881

Taracidae 

 Oskoron Shear, 2016
 Oskoron brevichelis Shear, 2016
 Oskoron crawfordi Shear, 2016
 Oskoron spinosus (Banks, 1894)
 Taracus Simon, 1879
Taracus aspenae Shear, 2018
 Taracus audisioae Shear, 2016
 Taracus birsteini Ljovuschkin, 1971
 Taracus carmanah Shear, 2016
 Taracus fluvipileus Shear, 2016
 Taracus gertschi Goodnight & Goodnight, 1942
 Taracus marchingtoni Shear & Warfel, 2016
 Taracus packardi Simon, 1879
 Taracus pallipes Banks, 1894
 Taracus silvestrii Roewer, 1929
 Taracus spesavius Shear, 2016
 Taracus taylori Shear, 2016
 Taracus timpanogos Shear, 2016
 Taracus ubicki Shear, 2016

Incertae sedis

 Crosbycus Roewer, 1914
 Crosbycus dasycnemus (Crosby, 1911)
 Hesperonemastoma Gruber, 1970
 Hesperonemastoma kepharti (Gruber & Bishop, 1924)
 Hesperonemastoma modestum (Banks, 1984)
 Hesperonemastoma packardi (Roewer, 1914)
 Hesperonemastoma pallidimaculosum (Goodnight & Goodnight, 1945)
 Hesperonemastoma smilax Shear, 2010

Troguloidea

Dicranolasmatidae 

 Dicranolasma (Herbst, 1799)
 Dicranolasma apuanum Marcellino, 1970
 Dicranolasma cretaeum Gruber, 1998
 Dicranolasma cristatum Thorell, 1876
 Dicranolasma giljarovi Silhavý, 1966
 Dicranolasma hirtum Loman, 1894
 Dicranolasma hoberlandti Silhavý, 1956
 Dicranolasma kurdistanum Starega, 1970
 Dicranolasma mladeni I. M. Karaman, 1990
 Dicranolasma opilionoides (L. Koch, 1867)
 Dicranolasma pauper Dahl, 1903
 Dicranolasma ponticum Gruber, 1998
 Dicranolasma ressli Gruber, 1998
 Dicranolasma scabrum (Herbst, 1799)
 Dicranolasma soerenseni Thorell, 1876
 Dicranolasma thracium Starega, 1976
 Dicranolasma verhoeffi Dahl, 1903

Nemastomatidae

Nemastomatinae 

 Acromitostoma Roewer, 1951
 Acromitostoma hispanum (Roewer, 1917)
 Acromitostoma rhinoceros (Roewer, 1917)
 Carinostoma Kratochvíl, 1958
 Carinostoma carinatum (Roewer, 1914)
 Carinostoma elegans (Sørensen, 1894)
 Carinostoma ornatum (Hadži, 1940)
 Caucnemastoma Martens, 2006
 Caucnemastoma golovatchi Martens, 2006
 Caucnemastoma martensi Snegovaya, 2011
 Centetostoma Kratochvíl, 1958
 Centetostoma centetes (Simon, 1881)
 Centetostoma juberthiei Martens, 2011
 Centetostoma scabriculum (Simon, 1879)
 Centetostoma ventalloi (Mello-Leitao, 1936)
 Giljarovia Kratochvíl, 1958
Giljarovia crimeana Tchemeris & Kovblyuk, 2012
 Giljarovia kratochvili Snegovaya, 2011
 Giljarovia redikorzevi Charitonov, 1946
 Giljarovia rossica Kratochvíl, 1958
 Giljarovia stridula (Kratochvíl, 1958)
 Giljarovia tenebricosa (Redikortsev, 1936)
 Giljarovia thoracocornuta Martens, 2006
 Giljarovia triangula Martens, 2006
 Giljarovia trianguloides Martens, 2006
 Giljarovia turica Gruber, 1976
 Giljarovia vestita Martens, 2006
 Hadzinia Šilhavý, 1966
Hadzinia ferrani Novak & Kozel, 2014
 Hadzinia karamani (Hadži, 1940)
 Histricostoma Kratochvíl, 1958
 Histrocostoma anatolicum (Roewer, 1962)
 Histricostoma argenteolunulatum (Canestrini, 1875)
 Histricostoma caucasicum (Redikortsev, 1936)
 Histricostoma creticum (Roewer, 1927)
 Histricostoma dentipalpe (Ausserer, 1867)
 Histricostoma drenskii Kratochvíl, 1958
 Histricostoma gruberi Snegovaya & Marusik, 2012
 Histricostoma mitovi Snegovaya & Marusik, 2012
 Mediostoma Kratochvíl, 1958
Mediostoma armatum Martens, 2006
 Mediostoma ceratocephalum Gruber, 1976
 Mediostoma cypricum (Roewer, 1951)
 Mediostoma globuliferum (L. Koch, 1867)
 Mediostoma haasi (Roewer, 1953)
 Mediostoma humerale (C.L. Koch, 1839)
 Mediostoma izmirica Snegovaya, Kurt, & Yağmur, 2016
 Mediostoma nigrum Martens, 2006
 Mediostoma pamiricum Staręga, 1986
 Mediostoma stussineri (Simon, 1885)
 Mediostoma variabile Martens, 2006
 Mediostoma vityae (Roewer, 1927)
 Mitostoma Roewer, 1951
 Mitostoma alpinum (Hadži, 1931)
 Mitostoma anophthalmum (Fage, 1946)
 Mitostoma atticum (Roewer, 1927)
 Mitostoma cancellatum (Roewer, 1917)
 Mitostoma carneluttii Hadži, 1973
 Mitostoma chrysomelas (Hermann, 1804)
 Mitostoma daccordii Tedeschi & Sciaky, 1997
 Mitostoma fabianae Tedescie & Sciaky, 1997
 Mitostoma gracile (Redikortsev, 1936)
 Mitostoma macedonicum Hadži, 1973
 Mitostoma olgae (Šilhavý, 1939)
 Mitostoma olgae olgae (Šilhavý, 1939)
 Mitostoma olgae decorum (Šilhavý, 1939)
 Mitostoma olgae kratochvili (Šilhavý, 1939)
 Mitostoma olgae zorae Hadži, 1973
 Mitostoma orobicum (Caporiacco, 1949)
 Mitostoma patrizii Roewer, 1953
 Mitostoma pyrenaeum (Simon, 1879)
 Mitostoma sabbadinii Tedeschi & Sciaky
 Mitostoma valdemonense Marcellino, 1974
 Mitostoma zmajevicae Hadži, 1973
 Nemaspela Šilhavý, 1966
Nemaspela abchasica (Ljovuschkin & Starobogatov, 1963)
 Nemaspela birsteini Ljovuschkin, 1972
 Nemaspela caeca (Grese, 1911)
 Nemaspela femorecurvata Martens, 2006
 Nemaspela gagrica Tchemeris, 2013
 Nemaspela kovali Tchemeris, 2009
 Nemaspela ladae Karaman, 2013
 Nemaspela sokolovi (Ljovuschkin & Starobogatov, 1963)
 Nemaspela taurica (Lebedinski, 1914)
 Nemastoma (C.L. Koch, 1836)
Nemastoma bidentatum Roewer, 1914
 Nemastoma bidentatum bidentatum Roewer, 1914
 Nemastoma bidentatum pluridentatum Hadži, 1973
 Nemastoma bidentatum sparsum Gruber & Martens, 1968
 Nemastoma bidentatum relictum Gruber & Martens, 1968
Nemastoma bimaculatum (Fabricius, 1775)
 Nemastoma dentigerum Canestrini, 1873
 Nemastoma lugubre (Müller, 1776)
 Nemastoma schuelleri Gruber & Martens, 1968
 Nemastoma transsylvanicum Gruber & Martens, 1968
 Nemastoma triste (C.L. Koch, 1835)
 Nemastomella Mello-Leitão, 1936
 Nemastomella armatissima (Roewer, 1962)
 Nemastomella bacillifera (Simon, 1879)
 Nemastomella bacillifera bacillifera (Simon, 1879)
 Nemastomella bacillifera carbonaria (Simon, 1907)
 Nemastomella cristinae (Rambla, 1969)
 Nemastomella dentipatellae (Dresco, 1967)
 Nemastomella dipentata (Rambla, 1959)
 Nemastomella dubia (Mello-Leitão, 1936)
 Nemastomella gevia Prieto, 2004
 Nemastomella hankiewiczii (Kulczyński, 1909)
 Nemastomella iberica (Rambla in Dresco, 1967)
 Nemastomella maarebensis (Simon, 1913)
 Nemastomella manicata (Simon, 1913)
 Nemastomella monchiquensis (Kraus, 1961)
 Nemastomella sexmucronata (Simon, 1911)
 Nemastomella spinosissima (Kraus, 1961)
 Paranemastoma Redikorzev, 1936
 Paranemastoma ancae Avram, 1973
 Paranemastoma armatum (Kulczyński, 1909)
 Paranemastoma aurigerum (Roewer, 1951)
 Paranemastoma aurigerum aurigerum (Roewer, 1951)
 Paranemastoma aurigerum ryla (Roewer, 1951)
 Paranemastoma aurigerum joannae Staręga, 1976
 Paranemastoma aurosum (L. Koch, 1869)
 Paranemastoma beroni Mitov, 2011
 Paranemastoma bicuspidatum (C.L. Koch, 1835)
 Paranemastoma bureschi (Roewer, 1926)
 Paranemastoma corcyraeum (Roewer, 1917)
 Paranemastoma filipes (Roewer, 1917)
 Paranemastoma iranicum Martens, 2006
 Paranemastoma kalischevskyi (Roewer, 1951)
 Paranemastoma kochii (Nowicki, 1870)
 Paranemastoma longipes (Schenkel, 1947)
 Paranemastoma quadripunctatum (Perty, 1833)
 Paranemastoma radewi (Roewer, 1926)
 Paranemastoma sillii (Herman, 1871)
 Paranemastoma sillii sillii (Herman, 1871)
 Paranemastoma sillii monticola Babalean, 2011
 Paranemastoma simplex (Giltay, 1932)
 Paranemastoma superbum Redikorzev, 1936
 Paranemastoma thessalum (Simon, 1885)
 Paranemastoma titaniacum (Roewer, 1914)
 Paranemastoma werneri (Kulczyński, 1903)
 Pyza Staręga, 1976
 Pyza anatolica (Roewer, 1959)
 Pyza bosnica (Roewer, 1917)
 Pyza navarrense (Roewer, 1951)
 Pyza taurica Gruber, 1979
 Saccarella Schönhofer & Martens, 2012
 Saccarella schilleri Schönhofer & Martens, 2012
 Sinostoma Martens, 2016
 Sinostoma yunnanicum Martens, 2016
 Starengovia Snegovaya, 2010
Starengovia kirgizica Snegovaya, 2010
 Starengovia ivanloebli Martens, 2017
 Starengovia quadrituberculata Zhang & Martens, 2018
 Vestiferum Martens, 2006
 Vestiferum alatum Martens, 2006
 Vestiferum funebre (Redikorzev, 1936)

Ortholasmatinae 

 Asiolasma Martens, 2019
Asiolasma ailaoshan (Zhang, Zhao & Zhang, 2018)
 Asiolasma angka (Schwendinger & Gruber, 1992)
 Asiolasma billsheari Martens, 2019
 Asiolasma damingshan (Zhang & Zhang, 2013)
 Asiolasma jeurgengruberi Martens, 2019
 Asiolasma schwendingeri Martens, 2019
 Cladolasma Suzuki, 1963
 Cladolasma parvulum Suzuki, 1963
 Cryptolasma Cruz-López, Cruz-Bonilla & Francke, 2018
 Cryptolasma aberrante Cruz-López, Cruz-Bonilla & Francke, 2018
 Cryptolasma citlaltepetl Cruz-López, Cruz-Bonilla & Francke, 2018
 Dendrolasma Banks, 1894
 Dendrolasma dentipalpe Shear & Gruber, 1983
 Dendrolasma mirabile Banks, 1894
 Martensolasma Shear, 2006
Martensolasma catrina Cruz-López, 2017
 Martensolasma jocheni Shear, 2006
 Ortholasma Banks, 1894
 Ortholasma colossus Shear, 2010
 Ortholasma coronadense Cockerell, 1916
 Ortholasma levipes Shear & Gruber, 1983
 Ortholasma pictipes Banks, 1911
 Ortholasma rugosum Banks, 1894
 Trilasma Goodnight & Goodnight, 1942
 Trilasma bolivari Goodnight & Goodnight, 1942
 Trilasma chipinquensis Shear, 2010
 Trilasma hidalgo Shear, 2010
 Trilasma petersprousei Shear, 2010
 Trilasma ranchonuevo Shear, 2010
 Trilasma sbordonii Šilhavý, 1973
 Trilasma tempestado Shear, 2010
 Trilasma trispinosum Shear, 2010
 Trilasma tropicum Shear, 2010

Nipponopsalididae 

 Nipponopsalis (Sato & Suzuki, 1939)
 Nipponopsalis abei (Sato & Suzuki, 1939)
 Nipponopsalis abei abei (Sato & Suzuki, 1939)
 Nipponopsalis abei longipes Suzuki, 1973
 Nipponopsalis coreana (Suzuki, 1966)
 Nipponopsalis yezoensis (Suzuki, 1958)

Trogulidae 

 Anarthrotarsus Silhavý, 1967
 Anarthrotarsus martensi Silhavý, 1967
 Anelasmocephalus Simon, 1879
 Anelasmocephalus balearicus Martens & Chemini, 1988
 Anelasmocephalus brignolii Martens & Chemini, 1988
 Anelasmocephalus calcaneatus Martens & Chemini, 1988
 Anelasmocephalus cambridgei (Westwood, 1874)
 Anelasmocephalus crassipes (H. Lucas, 1847)
 Anelasmocephalus hadzii Martens, 1978
 Anelasmocephalus lycosinus (Sørensen, 1873)
 Anelasmocephalus osellai Martens & Chemini, 1988
 Anelasmocephalus pusillus Simon, 1879
 Anelasmocephalus pyrenaicus Martens, 1978
 Anelasmocephalus rufitarsis Simon, 1879
 Anelasmocephalus tenuiglandis Martens & Chemini, 1988
 Anelasmocephalus tuscus Martens & Chemini, 1988
 Calathocratus Simon, 1879
Calathocratus africanus (H. Lucas, 1847)
 Calathocratus beieri Gruber, 1968
 Calathocratus caucasicus (Šilhavý, 1966)
 Calathocratus hirsutus Snegovaya, 2011
 Calathocratus intermedius Roewer, 1940
 Calathocratus kyrghyzicus (Tchemeris, 2013)
 Calathocratus minutus Snegovaya, 2011
 Calathocratus rhodiensis (Gruber, 1963)
 Calathocratus singularis (Roewer, 1940)
 Calathocratus sinuosus (Sørensen, 1873)
 Konfiniotis Roewer, 1940
 Konfiniotis creticus Roewer, 1940
 Trogulus Latreille, 1802
Trogulus aquaticus Simon, 1879
 Trogulus balearicus Schönhofer & Martens, 2008
 Trogulus banaticus Avram, 1971
 Trogulus cisalpinus Chemini & Martens, 1988
 Trogulus closanicus Avram, 1971
 Trogulus coriziformis C. L. Koch, 1839
 Trogulus cristatus Simon, 1879
 Trogulus falcipenis Komposch, 1999
 Trogulus graecus Dahl, 1903
 Trogulus gypseus Simon, 1879
 Trogulus hirtus Dahl, 1903
 Trogulus huberi Schönhofer & Martens, 2008
 Trogulus karamanorum Schönhofer & Martens, 2009
 Trogulus lusitanicus Giltay, 1932
 Trogulus martensi Chemini, 1983
 Trogulus megaligrava Schönhofer et al., 2013
 Trogulus melitensis Schönhofer & Martens, 2009
 Trogulus nepaeformis (Scopoli, 1763)
 Trogulus oltenicus Avram, 1971
 Trogulus ozimeci Schönhofer et al., 2013
 Trogulus pharensis Schönhofer & Martens, 2009
 Trogulus prietoi Schönhofer & Martens, 2008
 Trogulus pyrenaicus Schönhofer & Martens, 2008
 Trogulus rossicus Šilhavý, 1968
 Trogulus setosissimus Roewer, 1940
 Trogulus squamatus C. L. Koch, in Hahn & C .L .Koch 1839
 Trogulus tenuitarsus Schönhofer et al., 2013
 Trogulus thaleri Schönhofer & Martens, 2009
 Trogulus tingiformis C.L. Koch, in Hahn & C. L. Koch 1839
 Trogulus torosus Simon, 1885
 Trogulus tricarinatus (Linnaeus, 1767)
 Trogulus uncinatus Gruber, 1973

References

Harvestmen
Dyspnoi